Whitby is a provincial electoral district in Ontario, Canada, that was previously represented in the Legislative Assembly of Ontario as Whitby-Oshawa. The new riding was created through the 2015 Representation Act for the 2018 provincial election, with the district losing some territory to the district of Oshawa to more closely align to the actual town's borders.

History
The riding was created for the 2018 general provincial election and consists of the Town of Whitby. The previous district included sections of Oshawa and Ajax.

Demographics
2017 estimates; figures derived from Canada 2016 Census
 Population: 134,875 (estimate; actual census population from 2016 was 128,377)
 Languages: 91.7% English only, 7.6% Bilingual French-English, 0.5% neither English nor French
 Average individual income: $58,383 
 Median individual income: $41,419
 Average household income: $126,596
 Median household income: $101,373  
Denizens with Canadian citizenship: 130,327 (96.6%)
Denizens with citizenship other than Canadian: 4,547 (3.3%)
Immigrated between 2000-2005: 2,817 
Immigrated between 2006-2011: 2,338 
Immigrated after 2012: 2,386 
Born in province of residence: 95,247 
Born outside province of residence: 10,829

Members of Provincial Parliament

Election Results

References

External links
Elections Ontario - District of Whitby
Whitby Demographics and Statistics
Map of riding for 2018 election

Ontario provincial electoral districts
Whitby, Ontario